Rafael Ábalos (born 12 October 1956) is a Spanish author of the bestseller book Grimpow: The Invisible Road published in 2007. The children's fantasy novel was about a boy finding a mysterious amulet in France who becomes a focus of a "centuries-old mission" to enlighten humanity. According to a review in Publishers Weekly, Ábalos "blends the grand-scale storytelling prowess and epic quest element of Tolkien’s The Lord of the Rings with the cryptographic intrigue of Dan Brown’s The Da Vinci Code", and gave it a positive review. The book was published by Random House.

See also
Fantasy literature

References

1956 births
Living people
People from Archidona
Spanish children's writers
Writers from Andalusia
Spanish fantasy writers
21st-century Spanish novelists
Spanish male novelists